The Women's 15 kilometre freestyle mass start cross-country skiing competition at the 2002 Winter Olympics in Salt Lake City, United States, was held on 9 February at Soldier Hollow.

All 60 skiers began at once in a mass start. 2002 was the first time that a mass start was held in the Olympics.

The Race
This was the first Winter Olympic cross-country event skied entirely as a mass start race. Previously, this event was held at an interval start. It was also the first cross-country event in Salt Lake City, starting shortly before the men raced 30 km. The 2001 World Champion was Bente Skari of Norway elected not to contest this race, even though she had been the dominant female cross-country racer over the past five years.

The early leader in the race was Russian Yuliya Chepalova, but by 9 km, Italy's Stefania Belmondo, the 1999 World Champion in the event, moved ahead, until her pole broke at 10.5 km. She dropped back to 10th place, but trailed the leader, Larisa Lazutina, by only 10 seconds. Belmondo was given a pole by a French official but it was very long, so she struggled for over 500 metres until an Italian coach gave her one of her own poles. She then powered ahead, caught Lazutina and won a narrow victory by 1.8 seconds. Behind them, Czech skier Katerina Neumannová came in for the bronze medal. But Lazutina would not keep her silver medal. After the pursuit race, held six days later, she was found to have tested positive for darpopoietin, an erythropoietin analogue, and was disqualified in late 2003. Neumannová was moved up to silver medal, and Chepalova would get the bronze. Chepalova failed drug tests later in her career, but here Olympic results were left unaffected.

Results 
The race was started at 09:00.

References

Women's cross-country skiing at the 2002 Winter Olympics
Women's 15 kilometre cross-country skiing at the Winter Olympics